Knipping is a surname. Notable people with the surname include:

 Angelika Knipping (born 1961), German swimmer
 Arjan Knipping (born 1994), Dutch swimmer
 Tim Knipping (born 1992), German footballer

See also
 Kipping
 Knipp (surname)